Charles L. Perkins is the Founder and Chief Scientist of Virtual Rendezvous. He co-wrote a popular book on Java in October, 1995 , and created some (now historical) Java class hierarchy diagrams .

An edited except of "The Big Picture" section (thru "The Bytecodes Themselves" ) of the book was published in the Premiere issue of Java Report, March 1996. He has written several other books, including a number of volumes in the "Teach Yourself Java" series.

Books written by Perkins

1996:
Teach Yourself Java in 21 Days
Teach Yourself Java for Macintosh in 21 Days 
Teach Yourself Java in Cafe in 21 Days
Teach Yourself Sunsoft Java Workshop in 21 Days
Teach Yourself Java in 21 Days: Professional Reference Edition
1997:
Teach Yourself Java 1.1 In 21 Days (ASIN B000IQZY5M)
Teach Yourself Java 1.1 for Macintosh in 21 Days
2000:
Ad Hoc Networking. Boston, MA: Addison-Wesley, 2000.

References

Technology writers
Living people
Year of birth missing (living people)